KQPR (96.1 FM, "Power 96") is a radio station broadcasting a classic rock/full service format. Licensed to Albert Lea, Minnesota, United States, the station serves the Albert Lea-Austin area. The station is currently owned by Daniel and Barbara Massman, through licensee D&Z Media, LLC.

History
KQPR first went on the air on August 14, 1989. Sometime in the 1990s, it became a satellite station of KQCL, which originates out of Faribault.

On December 13, 2001, KQPR began broadcasting independently again from its own studios in Albert Lea, its city of license.

On March 29, 2004, KQPR increased its effective radiated power from 5,000 to 25,000 watts.

In August 2018, it was announced that Hometown Broadcasting was selling KQPR to D&Z Media. The official transfer of ownership was effective on January 2, 2019. Operations Manager Reggie Bauer was brought in with the new ownership, having previously worked for KDWA (the other station owned by Massman) as a teenager.

References

External links
KQPR official website

Radio stations in Minnesota
Classic rock radio stations in the United States